Leon Larsson (1883–1922), sometimes written Larson, was a Swedish author and anarchist.

References 

1883 births
1922 deaths
Swedish anarchists
Swedish socialists
Swedish male poets
Swedish male novelists
20th-century Swedish poets
20th-century Swedish novelists
20th-century Swedish male writers